Siliana is a modern farming town in northern Tunisia. It is the capital of the Siliana Governorate. It is located 4 miles away from Jama where the Battle of Zama occurred.

Siliana Dam, is located 10 km north of the city of Siliana.

History
During the Second Punic War The battle of Zama took place  ten kilometers from Siliana. There was a Roman town here during Roman Empire, it appears on the 4th century Peutinger Map.

Modern Siliana was founded in 1905.

In  April 1990 the Silianian people made the first Tunisian revolution against the police, it  was the first Tunisian voice ever against the government.

In November 2012, Siliana witnessed clashes between protesters for unemployment and the local police. Both Amnesty International and the UN High Commissioner for Human Rights, Navi Pillay called on the authorities to end the use of "excessive force".

Neighborhoods
Siliana has 17 neighborhoods 

  ons
  riadh 1
  riadh 2
  farhat hached
  hay monji slim (jlas)
  jomhoria
  ferdaous
  nour ( aben )
  sinaii
  al barid
  nouzha
  fleha
  basatin
  salah
 tay mhiri
 zouhour

Climate
Siliana has a cold semi-arid climate (Köppen climate classification BSk). In winter there is more rainfall than in summer. About  of precipitation falls annually.

Sports
Siliana is the home of Uss: union Siliana sport, a football team that was founded in 1955.

Education
There is one college in siliana: "Isetsl"

Gallery

References

Notes

External  links

Populated places in Tunisia
Communes of Tunisia